Parapercis pulchella, the harlequin sandsmelt, is a fish species in the sandperch family, Pinguipedidae. It is found in the Northwestern Pacific, including Japan, Taiwan and Hong Kong. 

References

Randall, J.E., 2008. Six new sandperches of the genus Parapercis from the Western Pacific, with description of a neotype for P. maculata (bloch and Schneider). The Raffles Bull. Zool. 19:159-178.

Pinguipedidae
Taxa named by Coenraad Jacob Temminck
Taxa named by Hermann Schlegel
Fish described in 1843